Arthur Henry Gibson, known as Victor Raine Gibson (18 July 1888 – 8 April 1958) was an English professional football player and coach active in Spain and France.

Early and personal life
Arthur Henry Gibson was born in Woolwich in 1888. He married in 1910 and had an infant daughter who died. He divorced his English wife in 1938 and married a Frenchwoman in 1939, with whom he also had a daughter.

Playing career
Under the name 'Victor Raine Gibson' he toured Catalonia with Plumstead FC, and in a match against RCD Espanyol on 18 May 1911, he put up a great performance which impressed the Catalan club enough for them to sign him, along with Frank Allack and William Hodge.  After a year in Spain he moved to French side Olympique Cettois.

Coaching career
Gibson coached the club sides of FC Cette, Montpellier, Marseille, Sochaux, SC Bastidienne and Hispano-Bastidienne.

He guided FC Cette to the 1923 Coupe de France Final, which they lost 4–2 to Red Star Olympique.

He also performed the functions of a coach with the Catalonia national team once, in what was the team's first-ever game recognized by FIFA on 20 February 1912, which ended in a 7–0 loss to France.

Later life and death
He returned to England in the 1930s, working as a gardener or groundsman. He divorced his English wife in 1938 and married a Frenchwoman in 1939, with whom he also had a daughter. He died in Ruislip in 1958.

References

1888 births
1958 deaths
English footballers
RCD Espanyol footballers
FC Sète 34 players
English football managers
FC Sète 34 managers
Montpellier HSC managers
Olympique de Marseille managers
FC Sochaux-Montbéliard managers
English expatriate footballers
English expatriate football managers
English expatriate sportspeople in Spain
Expatriate footballers in Spain
English expatriate sportspeople in France
Expatriate footballers in France
Expatriate football managers in France
English gardeners
Association footballers not categorized by position